Thomas Reddin (June 25, 1916 – December 4, 2004) was a Los Angeles Police Department chief from 1967 to 1969. He left May 6, 1969, to become a news commentator. He also owned a Los Angeles-based private security company, which was named for him.

Reddin helped modernize the department and introduced the community policing concept, which "perceives the community as an agent and partner in promoting security rather than as a passive audience." During his tenure, he allowed his department to give technical advice for the first three seasons of the revived version of the Jack Webb-created detective drama Dragnet (He even made an appearance at the end of the Season Two finale, "The Big Problem", in a plea for improved community relations between the department and the city) and during the first season (1968–1969) of the police drama Adam-12.

References

External links

 

1916 births
Chiefs of the Los Angeles Police Department
2004 deaths
Burials at Hollywood Forever Cemetery